Northlea is an area of Seaham, County Durham, England, to the north west of Seaham town centre and close to the North Sea coast.

References

Villages in County Durham